"Give Me One Reason" is a song written and performed by American singer-songwriter Tracy Chapman. It was included on her fourth studio album, New Beginning (1995), and was released as a single in various territories between November 1995 and March 1997, her first since 1992's "Dreaming On a World". The song is Chapman's biggest US hit, reaching number three on the Billboard Hot 100. It is also her biggest hit in Australia, where it reached number three as well, and it topped the charts of Canada and Iceland. Elsewhere, the song reached number 16 in New Zealand, but it underperformed in the United Kingdom, peaking at number 95 in March 1997.

Chapman first performed "Give Me One Reason" during her 1988 tour, seven years before its release. She also performed the song on the December 16, 1989, episode of Saturday Night Live. Chapman earned the Grammy Award for Best Rock Song for the track, and it was also nominated for Record of the Year, Song of the Year, and Best Female Rock Vocal Performance at the Grammy Awards of 1997. A version of this song featuring Eric Clapton was included on the 1999 compilation album A Very Special Christmas Live. A music video was released to promote the single.

Critical reception
Alan Jones from Music Week wrote, "Less intense and somewhat looser than her benchmark hit Fast Car, it perfectly mixes her folksy style with traditional R&B qualities, intelligent lyrics and that edgy distinctive voice. Compelling listening."

Pitchfork said the song was, "strutting along a plucked, head-nodding guitar melody and Chapman’s grainy alto. Centering on an imbalanced relationship, each verse grows more frustrated from a lack of reciprocity; then the band kicks in and the pleading in her voice becomes cathartic, begging for a reason to stay while knowing it won’t come."

Track listings

 US CD and cassette single
 "Give Me One Reason" – 4:31
 "The Rape of the World" – 7:07

 UK CD single
 "Give Me One Reason" (radio edit) – 4:08
 "Talkin' 'bout a Revolution" (LP version) – 2:38
 "All That You Have Is Your Soul" (LP version) – 5:16
 "Fast Car" (LP version) – 4:58

 European and Australian CD single
 "Give Me One Reason" (single edit) – 3:59
 "The Rape of the World" (LP version) – 7:07
 "House of the Rising Sun" – 2:00

 Australian cassette single
 "Give Me One Reason" (single edit) – 3:59
 "House of the Rising Sun" – 2:00

Charts

Weekly charts

Year-end charts

Decade-end charts

Certifications

Release history

Cover versions
In 2015, Kelly Clarkson covered the song for SiriusXM, garnering over 2.5 million views. She again covered the song for her talk show, The Kelly Clarkson Show, in 2021. The band Ruth covered the song on their 2009 digitally released The Covers EP. In 2021, Black Stone Cherry released two versions of the song on the deluxe edition of their album The Human Condition. Their versions peaked at No. 25 on Billboard's Mainstream Rock Airplay chart.

References

1995 singles
1995 songs
Elektra Records singles
Number-one singles in Iceland
Grammy Award for Best Rock Song
RPM Top Singles number-one singles
Song recordings produced by Don Gehman
Songs written by Tracy Chapman
Tracy Chapman songs